Anthony, Antony or Tony Holland may refer to:

 Anthony Henry Holland (1785–1830), Nova Scotia businessman and printer
 Anthony Holland (actor) (1928–1988), American actor
 Antony Holland (1920–2015), English actor, playwright, and theatre director
 Tony Holland (1940–2007), English television screenwriter
 Tony Holland (bodybuilder) (born 1939), British bodybuilder